Daisy Walker (born 4 June 2002) is an Australian rules footballer playing for the Carlton Football Club in the AFL Women's (AFLW). Walker was drafted by Carlton with pick 28 in the 2020 AFL Women's draft. She made her debut against  at Moorabbin Oval in the third round of the 2021 season.

Early life 
Walker grew up playing basketball before deciding to make the switch to football. She played under-18s football for the Sandringham Dragons in the NAB League Girls, averaging 16 disposals in three matches before the 2020 season was shut down due to the COVID-19 pandemic.

AFLW career 
 selected Walker with their second pick, and twenty-eight overall, in the 2020 AFL Women's draft.

Personal life 
Walker is the younger sister of North Melbourne footballer Will Walker.

Statistics
Statistics are correct to the end of Round 3, 2021.

|- style=background:#EAEAEA
| scope=row | 2021 ||  || 28
| 1 || 0 || 0 || 4 || 3 || 7 || 0 || 2 || 0.0 || 0.0 || 4.0 || 3.0 || 7.0 || 0.0 || 2.0 || 
|- class=sortbottom
! colspan=3 | Career
! 1 !! 0 !! 0 !! 4 !! 3 !! 7 !! 0 !! 2 !! 0.0 !! 0.0 !! 4.0 !! 3.0 !! 7.0 !! 0.0 !! 2.0 !! 
|}

References

External links 
 Daisy Walker at the Carlton Football Club
 Daisy Walker at AustralianFootball.com

2002 births
Living people
Carlton Football Club (AFLW) players
Australian rules footballers from Victoria (Australia)
Sandringham Dragons players (NAB League Girls)